Vingtaine du Coin Tourgis Sud is one of the five vingtaines of St Lawrence Parish in the Channel Island of Jersey.

History 
The Tourgis family owned the Fief des Arbres in 1292.

See also 
 Vingtaine du Coin Tourgis Nord

References

Tourgis Sud
Tourgis Sud